Hugleville-en-Caux (literally Hugleville in Caux) is a commune in the Seine-Maritime department in the Normandy region in northern France.

Geography
The A29 autoroute just touches the commune's northern border.

Population

Places of interest
 The church of Notre-Dame, dating from the eighteenth century.
 An eighteenth-century chateau, built on the ruins of an earlier castle.

See also
Communes of the Seine-Maritime department

References

Communes of Seine-Maritime
Seine-Maritime communes articles needing translation from French Wikipedia